Åseral is a municipality in Agder county, Norway. It is in the traditional district of Sørlandet. The administrative centre of the municipality is the village of Kyrkjebygda. Other villages in Åseral include Eikerapen, Kylland, Ljosland, and Åknes.

Åseral is an inland municipality, bordering Bygland municipality to the north and east, Evje og Hornnes to the east, Lyngdal to the south, Hægebostad to the southwest, and Kvinesdal in the west. Åseral is the headwaters of the river Mandalselva and the Mandalen valley.

The  municipality is the 131st largest by area out of the 356 municipalities in Norway. Åseral is the 338th most populous municipality in Norway with a population of 912.

General information

For centuries, the large parish of Bjelland encompassed the northern half of the Mandalen valley. The northern annex of the parish was Aaserald which was in the neighboring county of Nedenes while the main part of the parish was in Lister og Mandal county. When the formannskapsdistrikt law went into effect on 1 January 1838, each parish was created as a municipality, however, since Bjelland covered areas in two counties, it had to be split into two municipalities. The northern annex became the municipality of Aaserald (later spelled Åseral) in Nedenes county and the rest became the municipality of Bjelland og Grindum in Lister og Mandal county. On 1 September 1880, the municipality of Åseral was transferred from Nedenes county to Lister og Mandal county. Its municipal boundaries have never changed.

Name
The first part of the word is probably the genitive case of áss (m.), meaning "mountain ridge". The last part, áll (m.) means "long strip", probably referring to the long and narrow lake Øre. Historically, the name was spelled Aaserald or Aaseral. Since the early 20th century it has been spelled Åseral.

Coat of arms
The coat of arms was granted on 20 January 1989. The official blazon is "Vert a horseshoe argent". This means the arms have a green field (background) and the charge is a horseshoe. The horseshoe has a tincture of argent which means it is colored white most of the time, but if it is made out of metal, then silver is used. The green color in the field symbolizes the importance of forestry and the horseshoe was chosen to represent the historical importance of horses in the farming culture of Åseral as well as the symbol of good luck.

Churches
The Church of Norway has one parish within the municipality of Åseral. It is part of the Otredal prosti (deanery) in the Diocese of Agder og Telemark. Until 2019, it was part of the old Mandal prosti.

Government

All municipalities in Norway, including Åseral, are responsible for primary education (through 10th grade), outpatient health services, senior citizen services, unemployment and other social services, zoning, economic development, and municipal roads. The municipality is governed by a municipal council of elected representatives, which in turn elect a mayor.  The municipality falls under the Agder District Court and the Agder Court of Appeal.

Municipal council
The municipal council of Åseral is made up of 17 representatives that are elected to four year terms. Currently, the party breakdown is as follows:

Geography
Åseral is in the central, inland part of Southern Norway. It is in the Setesdalsheiene mountains and adjacent to the Setesdal valley to the northeast. Åseral has many lakes, some of which are dammed for purposes of hydroelectric power. Some of the lakes include Nåvatnet, Juvatn, Øre and Gyvatn. The river Mandalselva and the Mandalen valley both begin in Åseral.

Climate

Attractions
Åseral is a popular winter tourist destination with three ski resorts in the villages of Bortelid, Ljosland, and Eikerapen. Eikerapen is also the site of the annual Eikerapen Roots Festival, an international music festival attracting thousands of people from all over Europe.

Notable people 
 Lars Knutson Liestøl (1839–1912) a Norwegian politician, Mayor of Bygland in Aust-Agder for 12 years
 Knut Liestøl (1881 in Åseral – 1952) a Norwegian folklorist, Nynorsk proponent and politician

References

External links

Municipal fact sheet from Statistics Norway 

 
Municipalities of Agder
1838 establishments in Norway
Ski areas and resorts in Norway